Bromfield is a civil parish in Shropshire, England.  It contains 44 listed buildings that are recorded in the National Heritage List for England.  Of these, one is listed at Grade I, the highest of the three grades, two are at Grade II*, the middle grade, and the others are at Grade II, the lowest grade.  The parish contains the village of Bromfield and the surrounding countryside.  Two buildings have retained material from the 12th century, the gatehouse of Bromfield Priory, and St Mary the Virgin's Church.  In the parish is a country house, Oakly Park; this and associated structures are listed.  Most of the other listed buildings are houses, cottages, farmhouses and farm buildings.  Others include a public house, a former corn mill, a former sawmill, a bridge, a weir, and a war memorial.


Key

Buildings

References

Citations

Sources

Lists of buildings and structures in Shropshire